Javier Marcelo Páez (born September 23, 1975 in Merlo) is an Argentine football defender.

References
 Javier Páez – Argentine Primera statistics at Fútbol XXI  
 Profile and statistics of Javier Páez on One.co.il 
 

1975 births
Living people
Argentine footballers
Association football defenders
Club Atlético Independiente footballers
Deportivo Español footballers
Talleres de Córdoba footballers
Olimpo footballers
S.D. Quito footballers
Hapoel Tel Aviv F.C. players
Atlético Tucumán footballers
Chacarita Juniors footballers
Argentine Primera División players
Israeli Premier League players
Argentine expatriate footballers
Expatriate footballers in Israel
Expatriate footballers in Ecuador
Sportspeople from Buenos Aires Province